Tacarcuna is a genus of plants in the Phyllanthaceae first described as a genus in 1989. It is native to Panama, Colombia, Venezuela, and Peru. It is apparently dioecious, with male and female flowers on separate plants.

Species
 Tacarcuna amanoifolia Huft - Loreto Region in Peru; Amazonas Department in Colombia
 Tacarcuna gentryi Huft - Darién Province in Panama, Magdalena Department in Colombia
 Tacarcuna tachirensis Huft - Táchira State in Venezuela

References

Phyllanthaceae
Phyllanthaceae genera
Dioecious plants